Dylan Riley may be:
Dylan Riley (soccer) (born 1986), American soccer player
Dylan Riley (rugby union) (born 1997), Australian-Japanese rugby union player
Dylan John Riley (born 1971), American sociologist